The United States Senate elections of 1936 in New Jersey was held on November 3, 1936. 

Incumbent Republican William W. Barbour, who was appointed and then elected to succeed Dwight Morrow, ran for a full term in office but was defeated by State Senator William H. Smathers. Democrats would not win this seat again until 1978.

Republican primary

Candidates
David J. Allen
William Warren Barbour, incumbent Senator
C. Dan Coskey

Results

Democratic primary

Candidates
Theron McCampbell, Assemblyman from Holmdel and candidate for Governor in 1935
William H. Smathers, State Senator for Atlantic County

Results

Third parties and independents
George E. Bopp (Socialist Labor)
Herbert Coley (Communist)
Herman F. Niessner (Socialist)
Malcolm G. Thomas (National Prohibition)
Fred Turner (For Townsend Plan)

General election

Results

See also 
1936 United States Senate elections

References

New Jersey
1936
1936 New Jersey elections